William F. Tobin (October 10, 1854 – October 10, 1912) was a first baseman in Major League Baseball in . He split the season between two teams, debuting in July with the Worcester Ruby Legs and ending the year with the Troy Trojans. He died on his 58th birthday in 1912.

Sources

1854 births
1912 deaths
Baseball players from Hartford, Connecticut
Major League Baseball first basemen
Worcester Ruby Legs players
Troy Trojans players
19th-century baseball players
Auburn (minor league baseball) players
Rochester (minor league baseball) players
Albany (minor league baseball) players
Hartford (minor league baseball) players